Gundelsheim is a town in the district of Heilbronn in Baden-Württemberg in southern Germany.

It is situated on the right bank of the Neckar, 17 km northwest of Heilbronn. The town centre retains its narrow mediaeval street plan, as well as much of its mediaeval timber architecture. Pickled gherkin manufacture and wine-growing are the two principal agricultural products, and the Neckarsulm-Gundelsheim Weingärtnergenossenschaft (vintner's co-operative) is reputed to be the oldest in all of Germany.

The most remarkable building in Gundelsheim is Castle Horneck, a former residence of the Teutonic order, now hosting the Transylvanian Museum.

References

Heilbronn (district)
Populated places on the Neckar basin
Populated riverside places in Germany